Komyshivka is a village in Izmail Raion, Odesa Oblast (province) of southwestern Ukraine. It belongs to Safiany rural hromada, one of the hromadas of Ukraine.

Demographics
Native language as of the Ukrainian Census of 2001:

 Moldovan (Romanian) 94.53%
 Russian 3.41%
 Ukrainian 1.35%
 Bulgarian 0.54%
 Romanian (self-declared) 0.09%
 Gagauz 0.06%

References

Villages in Izmail Raion